Thomas Lemin (5 November 1905 – 29 November 1988) was a New Zealand cricketer. He played nine first-class matches for Otago between 1929 and 1943.

See also
 List of Otago representative cricketers

References

External links
 

1905 births
1988 deaths
New Zealand cricketers
Otago cricketers
Cricketers from Tasmania
People from Zeehan
Royal New Zealand Air Force cricketers